Dina Ghimpu (born June 27, 1957) is the wife of the former President of Moldova Mihai Ghimpu and is a former First Lady of Moldova.

She and former President Ghimpu have no children.

Biography 

She was born in June 1957. According to her, she and her husband in the early stages of her marriage "got divorced 10 times a day", also describing how they lived separately for six months, concluding that "this happens in all young couples".

From 1980 to 1986, she was a senior official at the Museum of Ethnography and Natural History of Moldova. In 1986, she became the head of Scientific Research at the Theatrical Museum of People's Theater. From 1992, she was a consultant at the Art Directorate of the Ministry of Culture and Tourism, and would keep that job for 17 years. She has been the Head of the General Directorate of Strategies and Cultural Policies of the Ministry of Culture since 2010. She was awarded the Order of Labor Glory by President Nicolae Timofti on 27 June 2012. According to the text of the decree, Ghimpu was awarded “for many years of fruitful work in the field of culture, contribution to the promotion of national values and high professional skills”.

References 

Living people
First ladies and gentlemen of Moldova
1957 births